Johann Maria Philipp Frimont, Count of Palota, Prince of Antrodoco (3 February 1759 – 26 December 1831) was an Austrian general.

Frimont was born at Fénétrange, in what is now French Lorraine. He entered the Austrian cavalry as a trooper in 1776, won his commission in the War of the Bavarian Succession, and took part in the Turkish wars and in the early campaigns against the French Revolutionary armies, in which he frequently earned distinction.

At Frankenthal in 1796 he won the Military Order of Maria Theresa. In the campaign of 1800 he distinguished himself greatly as a cavalry leader at Marengo (14 June), and in the next year became major-general. In the war of 1805 he was again employed in Italy and won further renown by his gallantry at the battle of Caldiero. In 1809 he again saw active service in Italy under the Archduke John in the rank of lieutenant field marshal, serving in Chasteler's Corps at 1st Sacile 15–16 April, and Caldiero (Soave). He commanded the rearguard at the Piave, but was defeated at 2nd Sacile and at Saint Daniel 11 May. He commanded the Reserve Corps at the Battle of Raab 14 June. In 1812 Frimont led the cavalry of Schwarzenberg's corps in the Russian campaign, serving at the action at Gorodetschna (Podobna, Prujany) 12 August. He replaced Schwarzenberg as commander in January 1813.

In 1813 he commanded V Armeekorps under Hiller in Italy, serving at Caldiero 15 November. After the Treaty of Paris (1814) he became military governor in Mainz. In 1815 he was commander-in-chief of the Austrian campaign in Italy, and his army penetrated France as far as Lyon, which was entered on 11 July. With the army of occupation he remained in France for some years, and in 1819 he commanded at Venice.

In 1821 he led the Austrian army which was employed against the Neapolitan rebels, and by 24 March he had victoriously entered Naples. His reward from King Ferdinand of Naples was the title of prince of Antrodoco and a handsome sum of money, and from his own master the rank of general of cavalry. After this he commanded in North Italy, and was called upon to deal with many outbreaks of the Italian patriots. He became president of the Aulic council in 1831, but died a few months later at Vienna.

References 

1759 births
1831 deaths
People from Moselle (department)
Austrian generals
Counts of Austria
Hungarian nobility
Austrian people of French descent
French expatriates in Hungary
Austrian Empire commanders of the Napoleonic Wars
Austrian Empire military personnel of the French Revolutionary Wars
Commanders Cross of the Military Order of Maria Theresa
Honorary Knights Grand Cross of the Order of the Bath